Titaresius jeanneli is a species of beetle in the family Carabidae, the only species in the genus Titaresius.

References

Lebiinae